Ricco Rodriguez (born August 19, 1977) is an American semi-retired mixed martial artist currently competing in the heavyweight division. A professional competitor since 1999, he has competed for the UFC, PRIDE Fighting Championships, EliteXC, International Fight League, BAMMA, World Extreme Cagefighting, and Bellator. Ricco is a former UFC Heavyweight Champion, Mundials World Champion and also an ADCC World Champion. He is also the former King of the Cage World Heavyweight Champion.

Early life
Rodriguez was born in San Jose, CA and grew up in the projects in Paterson, New Jersey. Rodriguez wrestled at Tottenville High School while living in Staten Island, New York. He later moved to California and began training in the art of Brazilian Jiu-Jitsu with Rigan and Jean Jacques Machado. He competed and won many Jiu-Jitsu tournaments before moving on to mixed martial arts.

Mixed martial arts career
In 1997, Ricco Rodriguez became one of the small group of Americans to win a Brazilian Jiu-Jitsu World Championship, taking the Blue Belt Absolute title. He took gold in +99 kg in the first ADCC Submission Wrestling World Championship in 1998, bronze in the Absolute (open weight) division in 1999 and Silver in the +99 kg category in 2000. That same year Rodriguez began his MMA career with a win against Rocky Batastini. He won several of his first matches before losing to Bobby Hoffman at the Superbrawl 13 event in Hawaii. He later fought in the PRIDE Fighting Championship before moving on to the Ultimate Fighting Championship.

Ultimate Fighting Championship
Rodriguez's first UFC match was at UFC 32 against future UFC Heavyweight Champion and #1 ranked pound for pound fighter in the world Andrei Arlovski which he won by TKO. He was scheduled to fight Lion’s Den fighter and owner of one of the most vicious knockouts of the time Pete Williams at UFC 33, but the fight was postponed until UFC 34 due to an injury suffered by Williams during training.

Rodriguez went on to beat Williams, Jeff Monson (UFC 35) and Tsuyoshi Kohsaka (UFC 37) to earn a shot for the vacant heavyweight championship against future UFC Hall of Famer Randy Couture at UFC 39 becoming the first person of Puerto Rican descent to win the UFC Heavyweight Championship. Rodriguez was losing on the scorecard in the initial rounds. In the fifth round Rodriguez was able to achieve a ground-and-pound victory with a stoppage by verbal tapout. In his first title defense, he was knocked out by 6'8 up and coming striker Tim Sylvia in the first round, thus losing the belt.

Independent promotions
Following the end of his UFC contract, Rodriguez fought for a number of regional and national promotions. He also gained a significant amount of weight, at one point weighing . On July 22, 2006, in a rematch of their August 2005 bout in the WEC, he avenged a loss to Ron Waterman at WFA: King of the Streets.

Following his win against Imani Lee on November 17, 2006, Rodriguez was put under indefinite suspension by the California State Athletic Commission. The Wrestling Observer Newsletter reported that Rodriguez had tested positive for both marijuana and cocaine and was subsequently given a six-month suspension for the failed drug test.

On July 27, 2007, Ricco Rodriguez, in his first fight after his suspension, defeated Lloyd Marshbanks by first-round TKO at MMA Xtreme 13, which was held in Puebla, Mexico. At the IFL championship finals, he lost to "Big" Ben Rothwell by unanimous decision.

Rodriguez fought in the YAMMA Pit Fighting one-night heavyweight tournament as a late replacement. He defeated George Bush III in the first round by unanimous decision, but was beaten by eventual champion Travis Wiuff in the semi-finals by unanimous decision.

Ricco Rodriguez was scheduled to replace an injured Kevin Randleman in a rematch of their UFC 35 bout against Jeff Monson at the inaugural Godz of War show. That event was canceled, however, and the fight was rescheduled for the inaugural Mixed Fighting Alliance (MFA) event, which Rodriguez lost by unanimous decision.

At the 2009 ADCC qualifiers Rodriguez weighed in at a svelte 218 lb, down well over 100 lb from his peak in the mid-2000s.  Rodriguez attributed his weight loss to a renewed focus and partnership with a new nutritional coach and long-time friend, Richard Sicola-Stone.

Rodriguez missed weight for his first attempt at fighting at 205 pounds at the inaugural Israel Fighting Championship event on Nov. 9. He still fought and won his fight over Daniel Tabera, however, and then promptly challenged his friend, Jeff Monson for a rubber match, to a fight at 205 pounds.

Ricco Rodriguez made his BAMMA debut facing The Ultimate Fighter 10 alumni and UFC veteran James McSweeney who was also making his debut for the promotion. Dana White has claimed if Rodriguez wins this bout he will consider resigning him to the UFC. Rodriguez missed weight for the fight, weighing in a full 2 pounds over the contracted 215-pound catchweight.

Ricco made his Bellator debut against the man who first defeated the internet superstar Kimbo Slice, Seth Petruzelli at Bellator 48. He lost the fight via KO (punches) in the first round after getting caught with an overhand right, and ending his 12-fight winning streak.

On April 15, 2013, it was announced that Ricco signed a 3-fight contract for Final Fight Championship. His first fight for the promotion was at FFC05: Rodriguez vs. Simonič event on May 24. 2013, when he fought Slovenian Tomaž Simonič. He won the fight via first round armbar.

On November 9, 2013, he lost to Denis Stojnić on Bosnia Fight Championship event by TKO after an early referee stoppage. Rodriguez immediately stood up and protested the stoppage and left the fight showing the middle finger to the referee. It was announced that they would have a rematch in 2014, also in Sarajevo, however the day after the event, the referee said he was not up to the task and the fight result was changed to NC.

In his next fight, Rodriguez faced Nestoras Batzelas at  Final Fight Championship 10 on December 13, 2013. He won the fight via TKO. He then faced Dion Staring for the FFC Heavyweight Championship at  Final Fight Championship 17 on December 20, 2014. Despite coming out strong in the opening minute of the first round, Rodriguez would be dropped by a front kick from Staring midway through the first round and subsequently beaten up by ground and pound, and lost the bout via retirement TKO after failing to answer the bell for the third round.
After a series of losses, including a match with former PRIDE star Gilbert Yvel, Rodriguez won the CFS Heavyweight title in Graz, Austria defeating Nandor Guelmino.

Boxing career
Rodriguez made his professional boxing debut on October 12, 2006, beating 19-year-old Cruiserweight Brandon Baker by knockout. On July 8, 2008, Rodriguez fought his second professional boxing bout losing via split decision to Chad Davies, who came into the fight with a 0-1 record.

Bare knuckle boxing
Rodriguez faced Lewis Rumsey at a Bare Knuckle FC event held on June 2, 2018. He won the fight via unanimous decision.

Other appearances
Rodriguez appeared in an episode of the History Channel series Human Weapon, in which he faced Bill Duff in a draw. He also appears in bonus footage of The Smashing Machine: The Life and Times of Extreme Fighter Mark Kerr DVD.

Rodriguez has appeared on season one of the VH1 reality television show Celebrity Rehab with Dr. Drew, which documented his struggle with substance abuse.

Personal life
Rodriguez is Mexican. He has a daughter and one son.

Championships and accomplishments

Mixed martial arts
 King of the Cage
 KOTC Heavyweight Championship (One time)
 Ultimate Fighting Championship
 UFC Heavyweight Championship (One time)
 YAMMA Pit Fighting
 YAMMA Heavyweight Tournament Semifinalist
 Ultimate Warrior Challenge
 UWC Heavyweight Championship (One time)
 UWC British Heavyweight Championship (One time)
Cage Fight Series
 CFS Heavyweight Championship (One time)

Submission grappling
 ADCC
 ADCC 1998 Over 99 Division - Gold Medalist
 ADCC 1999 Absolute Division - Bronze Medalist
 ADCC 2000 Over 99 Division - Silver Medalist

Mixed martial arts record

| Loss
| align=center| 54–27 (1)
| Hatef Moeil
| Decision (unanimous)
| CFS 9: Cage Fight Series 9
| 
| align=center|3
| align=center|5:00
| Austria
|                                                                                    
|- 
| Loss
| align=center| 54–26 (1)
| Alex Nicholson
| TKO (submission to punches)
| AFC 24: CamSoda Legends
| 
| align=center|1
| align=center|1:27
| Fort Lauderdale, Florida, United States
|                                                                                    
|-
| Win
| align=center| 54–25 (1)
| Nandor Guelmino
| Submission (forearm choke)
| Cage Fight Series part 8
| 
| align=center|3
| align=center|2:30
| Graz, Austria
|                                                                                        
|-
| Loss
| align=center| 53–25 (1)
| Gilbert Yvel
| TKO (leg kicks)
| WFCA 31: Ushukov vs. Vagaev
| 
| align=center| 1
| align=center| 1:00
| Grozny, Russia
| 
|-
| Loss
| align=center| 53–24 (1)
| Ivan Shtyrkov
| TKO (punches)
| RCC Boxing Promotions
| 
| align=center| 1
| align=center| 1:55
| Sverdlovsk, Russia
| 
|-
| Loss
| align=center| 53–23 (1)
| Denis Stojnić
| TKO (punches)
| Bosnia Fight Championship 2
| 
| align=center| 2
| align=center| 0:22
| Sarajevo, Bosnia and Herzegovina
|
|-
| Loss
| align=center| 53–22 (1)
| Dion Staring
| TKO (retirement)
|  Final Fight Championship 17
| 
| align=center| 2
| align=center| 5:00
| Opatija, Croatia
| 
|-
| Win
| align=center| 53–21 (1)
| Nestoras Batzelas
| TKO (punches)
|  Final Fight Championship 10
| 
| align=center|2
| align=center|3:33
| Skopje, Macedonia
| 
|-
| NC
| align=center| 52–21 (1)
| Denis Stojnić
| NC 
| Bosnian Fight Championship
| 
| align=center|1
| align=center|4:55
| Sarajevo, Bosnia and Herzegovina
| 
|-
| Win
| align=center| 52–21
| Zelg Galešić
| Submission (armbar)
|  Final Fight Championship 8
| 
| align=center|1
| align=center|2:10
| Zagreb, Croatia
| 
|-
| Loss
| align=center| 51–21
| Ian Freeman
| TKO (punches)
| UCFC 5: Legends of MMA
| 
| align=center|1
| align=center|2:11
| Doncaster, England
| 
|-
| Loss
| align=center| 51–20
| Marcin Lazarz
| Decision (unanimous)
| GWC: The British Invasion: US vs. UK
| 
| align=center| 3
| align=center| 5:00
| Kansas City, Missouri, United States
| 
|-
| Win
| align=center| 51–19
| Tomaz Simonic
| Submission (armbar)
| FFC: Final Fight Championship 5
| 
| align=center| 1
| align=center| 3:49
| Osijek, Croatia
| 
|-
| Win
| align=center| 50–19
| Andreas Kraniotakes
| Decision (unanimous)
| CFS 7: Cage Fight Series 7
| 
| align=center| 3
| align=center| 5:00
| Unterpremstätten, Styria, Austria
| 
|-
| Loss
| align=center| 49–19
| Ante Delija
| Decision (unanimous)
| HOG: House of Gladiators 1
| 
| align=center| 2
| align=center| 5:00
| Dubrovnik, Croatia
| 
|-
| Win
| align=center| 49–18
| Kevin Thompson
| Submission (armbar)
| UWC 21: Xplosion
| 
| align=center| 1
| align=center| 4:45
| Southend-on-Sea, Essex, England
| 
|-
| Loss
| align=center| 48–18
| Stav Economou
| Decision (unanimous)
| Dubai FC 1: The Beginning
| 
| align=center| 3
| align=center| 5:00
| Dubai, United Arab Emirates
| 
|-
| Loss
| align=center| 48–17
| Ruslan Magomedov
| Decision (unanimous)
| United Glory 15: 2012 Glory World Series
| 
| align=center| 3
| align=center| 5:00
| Moscow, Moscow Oblast, Russia
| 
|-
| Loss
| align=center| 48–16
| Alexander Volkov
| Decision (unanimous)
| BF: Baltic Challenge 3
| 
| align=center| 3
| align=center| 5:00
| Kaliningrad, Russia
| 
|-
| Loss
| align=center| 48–15
| Blagoi Ivanov
| TKO (retirement)
| CMMAT: Chekhov MMA Tournament
| 
| align=center| 3
| align=center| 3:33
| Chekhov, Moscow Oblast, Russia
| 
|-
| Win
| align=center| 48–14
| Bashir Yamilkhanov
| TKO (punches)
| FEFoMP: Battle of Empires
| 
| align=center| 2
| align=center| 2:56
| Khabarovsk, Khabarovsk Krai, Russia
| 
|-
| Loss
| align=center| 47–14
| Glover Teixeira
| TKO (submission to punches)
| MMAAD: MMA Against Dengue
| 
| align=center| 1
| align=center| 1:58
| Duque de Caxias, Rio de Janeiro, Brazil
| 
|-
| Loss
| align=center| 47–13
| Michał Kita
| Decision (unanimous)
| MMAA: MMA Attack
| 
| align=center| 2
| align=center| 5:00
| Warsaw, Masovian Voivodeship, Poland
| 
|-
| Loss
| align=center| 47–12
| Seth Petruzelli
| TKO (punches)
| Bellator 48
| 
| align=center| 1
| align=center| 4:21
| Uncasville, Connecticut, United States
| 
|-
| Win
| align=center| 47–11
| Doug Williams
| Submission (rear-naked choke)
| Shark Fights 17: Horwich vs. Rosholt 2
| 
| align=center| 1
| align=center| 2:16
| Frisco, Texas, United States
| 
|-
| Win
| align=center| 46–11
| James McSweeney
| Decision (unanimous)
| BAMMA 5: Daley vs. Shirai
| 
| align=center| 3
| align=center| 5:00
| Manchester, England
| 
|-
| Win
| align=center| 45–11
| Daniel Tabera
| Decision (unanimous)
| Israel Fighting Championship: Genesis
| 
| align=center| 3
| align=center| 5:00
| Tel Aviv, Israel
| 
|-
| Win
| align=center| 44–11
| John Juarez
| Decision (split)
| USA MMA: Stacked
| 
| align=center| 3
| align=center| 5:00
| Baton Rouge, Louisiana, United States
| 
|-
| Win
| align=center| 43–11
| Bobby Martinez
| Submission (heel hook)
| AFA 4: Parking Lot Beatdown
| 
| align=center| 1
| align=center| 1:03
| Fort Wayne, Indiana, United States
| 
|-
| Win
| align=center| 42–11
| Ken Sparks
| TKO (punches)
| USA MMA: Legends
| 
| align=center| 1
| align=center| 2:32
| Kinder, Louisiana, United States
| 
|-
| Win
| align=center| 41–11
| Travis Fulton
| KO (head kick)
| CT: Cage Thug
| 
| align=center| 1
| align=center| N/A
| Waterloo, Iowa, United States
| 
|-
| Win
| align=center| 40–11
| Brian Ryan
| TKO (punches)
| XKL: Evolution 1
| 
| align=center| 2
| align=center| 2:05
| Ypsilanti, Michigan, United States
| 
|-
| Win
| align=center| 39–11
| Patrick Miller
| TKO (punches)
| STFC 10: Annihilation
| 
| align=center| 2
| align=center| 2:20
| McAllen, Texas, United States
| 
|-
| Win
| align=center| 38–11
| Moise Rimbon
| Decision (split)
| IAFC: Mayor's Cup 2009
| 
| align=center| 3
| align=center| 3:00
| Novosibirsk, Novosibirsk Oblast, Russia
| 
|-
| Win
| align=center| 37–11
| Justin Howard
| TKO (submission to punches)
| KOK 7: Judgement Day
| 
| align=center| 1
| align=center| 2:05
| Austin, Texas, United States
| 
|-
| Win
| align=center| 36–11
| John Brown
| Submission (rear-naked choke)
| Reality Combat: The Return
| 
| align=center| 3
| align=center| 2:34
| Slidell, Louisiana, United States
| 
|-
| Loss
| align=center| 35–11
| Mario Rinaldi
| Decision (unanimous)
| WFC: Battle Of The Bay 8
| 
| align=center| 3
| align=center| 5:00
| Tampa, Florida, United States
| 
|-
| Win
| align=center| 35–10
| Doug Williams
| Submission (anaconda choke)
| Armagedon Fighting Championships 09
| 
| align=center| 1
| align=center| 1:02
| Tyler, Texas, United States
| 
|-
| Loss
| align=center| 34–10
| Jeff Monson
| Decision (unanimous)
| Mixed Fighting Alliance "There Will Be Blood"
| 
| align=center| 3
| align=center| 5:00
| Miami, Florida, United States
| 
|-
| Win
| align=center| 34–9
| Robert Beraun
| Decision (unanimous)
| Rage in the Cage 117
| 
| align=center| 3
| align=center| 3:00
| Phoenix, Arizona, United States
| 
|-
| Win
| align=center| 33–9
| Rob Broughton
| Submission (kneebar)
| Cage Gladiators 9
| 
| align=center| 2
| align=center| 3:39
| Liverpool, England
| 
|-
| Win
| align=center| 32–9
| Titus Campbell
| Submission (guillotine choke)
| Silver Crown Fights
| 
| align=center| 2
| align=center| 3:06
| Fort Wayne, Indiana, United States
| 
|-
| Win
| align=center| 31–9
| Johnathan Ivey
| Decision (unanimous)
| Xp3: The Proving Ground
| 
| align=center| 3
| align=center| 3:00
| Houston, Texas, United States
| 
|-
| Win
| align=center| 30–9
| Chris Guillen
| Submission (armbar)
| Ultimate Combat Experience 1
| 
| align=center| 1
| align=center| 4:30
| West Valley City, Utah, United States
| 
|-
| Loss
| align=center| 29–9
| Travis Wiuff
| Decision (unanimous)
| rowspan="2"|YAMMA Pit Fighting
| rowspan="2"|
| align=center| 1
| align=center| 5:00
| Atlantic City, New Jersey, United States
| rowspan="2"|
|-
| Win
| align=center| 29–8
| George Bush
| Decision (unanimous)
| align=center| 1
| align=center| 5:00
| Atlantic City, New Jersey, United States
|-
| Loss
| align=center| 28–8
| Antônio Silva
| Decision (split)
| EliteXC: Street Certified
| 
| align=center| 3
| align=center| 5:00
| Miami, Florida, United States
| 
|-
| Win
| align=center| 28–7
| Kevin Filal
| TKO (retirement)
| PFP: Ring of Fire
| 
| align=center| 1
| align=center| N/A
| Manila, Philippines
| 
|-
| Loss
| align=center| 27–7
| Ben Rothwell
| Decision (unanimous)
| IFL 2007 World Championship Finals
| 
| align=center| 3
| align=center| 4:00
| Hollywood, Florida, United States
| 
|-
| Win
| align=center| 27–6
| Lloyd Marshbanks
| TKO (punches)
| MMA Xtreme 13
| 
| align=center| 1
| align=center| 3:11
| Tijuana, Mexico
| 
|-
| Win
| align=center| 26–6
| Imani Lee
| Submission (rear-naked choke)
| BIB: Beatdown in Bakersfield
| 
| align=center| 1
| align=center| 2:12
| Bakersfield, California, United States
| 
|-
| Win
| align=center| 25–6
| Abdias Irisson
| TKO (punches)
| MMA Xtreme 7
| 
| align=center| 1
| align=center| N/A
| Tijuana, Mexico
| 
|-
| Win
| align=center| 24–6
| Ron Waterman
| TKO (doctor stoppage)
| WFA: King of the Streets
| 
| align=center| 1
| align=center| 5:00
| Los Angeles, California, United States
| 
|-
| Win
| align=center| 23–6
| Taylor Brooks
| Submission (armbar)
| MMA Xtreme 1
| 
| align=center| 1
| align=center| N/A
| Tijuana, Mexico
| 
|-
| Loss
| align=center| 22–6
| Robert Beraun
| Decision (unanimous)
| RITC 78: Back with a Vengeance
| 
| align=center| 3
| align=center| 3:00
| Glendale, Arizona, United States
| 
|-
| Win
| align=center| 22–5
| Tyler Brooks
| Submission (armbar)
| Pro Fight League
| 
| align=center| 1
| align=center| 4:00
| Phoenix, Arizona, United States
| 
|-
| Win
| align=center| 21–5
| David Mori
| Decision (unanimous)
| MMA Fighting Challenge 4
| 
| align=center| 3
| align=center| 5:00
| Guadalajara, Mexico
| 
|-
| Win
| align=center| 20–5
| Corey Salter
| Submission (armbar)
| Ultimate Texas Showdown 3
| 
| align=center| 2
| align=center| 0:17
| Dallas, Texas, United States
| 
|-
| Win
| align=center| 19–5
| Jimmy Ambriz
| TKO (submission to punches)
| WEC 17
| 
| align=center| 1
| align=center| 4:13
| Lemoore, California, United States
| 
|-
| Loss
| align=center| 18–5
| Ron Waterman
| Decision (unanimous)
| WEC 16
| 
| align=center| 3
| align=center| 5:00
| Lemoore, California, United States
| 
|-
| Win
| align=center| 18–4
| Andy Montana
| Submission (armbar)
| Independent event
| 
| align=center| 1
| align=center| 1:50
| Fountain Hills, Arizona, United States
| 
|-
| Win
| align=center| 17–4
| Ruben Villareal
| Submission (armbar)
| Extreme Wars: X-1
| 
| align=center| 1
| align=center| 2:38
| Honolulu, Hawaii, United States
| 
|-
| Win
| align=center| 16–4
| Scott Junk
| Submission (front choke)
| Rumble on the Rock 7
| 
| align=center| 2
| align=center| 0:42
| Honolulu, Hawaii, United States
| 
|-
| Win
| align=center| 15–4
| Mike Seal
| Submission (rear-naked choke)
| MMA Mexico: Day 2
| 
| align=center| 1
| align=center| 1:06
| Ciudad Juárez, Mexico
| 
|-
| Loss
| align=center| 14–4
| Pedro Rizzo
| Decision (unanimous)
| UFC 45
| 
| align=center| 3
| align=center| 5:00
| Uncasville, Connecticut, United States
| 
|-
| Loss
| align=center| 14–3
| Antônio Rodrigo Nogueira
| Decision (unanimous)
| PRIDE Total Elimination 2003
| 
| align=center| 3
| align=center| 5:00
| Saitama, Japan
| 
|-
| Loss
| align=center| 14–2
| Tim Sylvia
| TKO (punches)
| UFC 41
| 
| align=center| 1
| align=center| 3:09
| Atlantic City, New Jersey, United States
| 
|-
| Win
| align=center| 14–1
| Randy Couture
| TKO (submission to elbow)
| UFC 39
| 
| align=center| 5
| align=center| 3:04
| Uncasville, Connecticut, United States
| 
|-
| Win
| align=center| 13–1
| Tsuyoshi Kohsaka
| TKO (punches)
| UFC 37
| 
| align=center| 2
| align=center| 3:25
| Bossier City, Louisiana, United States
| 
|-
| Win
| align=center| 12–1
| Jeff Monson
| TKO (punches)
| UFC 35
| 
| align=center| 3
| align=center| 3:00
| Uncasville, Connecticut, United States
| 
|-
| Win
| align=center| 11–1
| Pete Williams
| TKO (punches)
| UFC 34
| 
| align=center| 2
| align=center| 4:02
| Las Vegas, Nevada, United States
| 
|-
| Win
| align=center| 10–1
| Andrei Arlovski
| TKO (punches)
| UFC 32
| 
| align=center| 3
| align=center| 1:23
| East Rutherford, New Jersey, United States
| 
|-
| Win
| align=center| 9–1
| Paul Buentello
| Submission (kneebar)
| KOTC 7: Wet and Wild
| 
| align=center| 2
| align=center| 4:21
| San Jacinto, California, United States
| 
|-
| Win
| align=center| 8–1
| John Marsh
| Decision (unanimous)
| PRIDE 12
| 
| align=center| 2
| align=center| 5:00
| Saitama, Japan
| 
|-
| Win
| align=center| 7–1
| Giant Ochiai
| Submission (smother choke)
| PRIDE 10
| 
| align=center| 1
| align=center| 6:04
| Saitama, Japan
| 
|-
| Win
| align=center| 6–1
| Gary Goodridge
| Decision (unanimous)
| PRIDE 9
| 
| align=center| 2
| align=center| 10:00
| Nagoya, Japan
| 
|-
| Win
| align=center| 5–1
| Travis Fulton
| Submission (armbar)
| KOTC 2: Desert Storm
| 
| align=center| 1
| align=center| 4:49
| San Jacinto, California, United States
| 
|-
| Win
| align=center| 4–1
| Sam Adkins
| Submission (forearm choke)
| Armageddon 2
| 
| align=center| 1
| align=center| 4:32
| Houston, Texas, United States
| 
|-
| Loss
| align=center| 3–1
| Bobby Hoffman
| KO (punches)
| SuperBrawl 13
| 
| align=center| 1
| align=center| 3:13
| Honolulu, Hawaii, United States
| 
|-
| Win
| align=center| 3–0
| Steve Shaw
| Submission (armbar)
| Rage in the Cage 6
| 
| align=center| 1
| align=center| 1:34
| Phoenix, Arizona, United States
| 
|-
| Win
| align=center| 2–0
| Rocky Batastini
| Submission (armbar)
| Extreme Cage
| 
| align=center| 1
| align=center| 4:58
| Phoenix, Arizona, United States
| 
|-
| Win
| align=center| 1–0
| Scott Adams
| Decision 
| Extreme Cage
| 
| align=center| 3
| align=center| 4:00
| Phoenix, Arizona, United States
|

Bare knuckle record

|- 
|Win
|align=center|1-0
|Lewis Rumsey
|Decision (unanimous)
|BKFC 1: The Beginning
|
|align=center|5
|align=center|2:00
|Cheyenne, Wyoming, United States
|
|-

References

External links 
 
 

 

1977 births
Living people
American male mixed martial artists
Heavyweight mixed martial artists
Mixed martial artists utilizing wrestling
Mixed martial artists utilizing boxing
Mixed martial artists utilizing Brazilian jiu-jitsu
American mixed martial artists of Mexican descent
Mixed martial artists from California
Mixed martial artists from New Jersey
American people of Puerto Rican descent
American practitioners of Brazilian jiu-jitsu
People awarded a black belt in Brazilian jiu-jitsu
Participants in American reality television series
Ultimate Fighting Championship champions
Ultimate Fighting Championship male fighters
People from Vienna, Virginia
Sportspeople from Fairfax County, Virginia
Bare-knuckle boxers